Ralph Brown  (1928 – 2013) was an English sculptor who came to national prominence in the late 1950s with his large-scale bronze Meat Porters, commissioned for Harlow New Town, Essex and is known for his sensual, figurative sculptures.

Early career 

Ralph Brown was born in Leeds, and is the younger contemporary of the eminent group of Yorkshire sculptors that include Barbara Hepworth, Henry Moore and Kenneth Armitage. Between 1948 and 1951 he studied at Leeds College of Art, where both Moore and Hepworth attended. He then spent a year at Hammersmith School of Art before entering the Royal College of Art in 1952 where he was taught by Frank Dobson, John Skeaping and Leon Underwood.  He won a number of scholarships including a trip to Paris to work in the studio of Ossip Zadkine where he also saw work by Auguste Rodin and Germain Richier and met Giacometti. In 1957 he won the Boise Scholarship to Italy where he was inspired by the work of Marino Marini and Giacomo Manzu. Brown also worked in Cannes making mosaics for Pablo Picasso

Style and technique 

Like Henry Moore who befriended him and encouraged him by buying his work, Brown's art is deeply rooted in the figurative tradition. However, whilst his predecessors focused their energies on carving and maintaining 'truth to materials', Brown concentrated on modelling allowing him to interact with his material on a more intimate level. In the introductory catalogue essay for Brown's major retrospective show at Leeds City Art Gallery in 1988 Dennis Farr commented: "So much of Brown's sculpture is his search for equivalents, in formal terms, for sensual experiences."

Harlow New Town Commission 
Brown came to national prominence in the late 1950s with his large-scale bronze group Meat Porters, commissioned for Harlow New Town, Essex. The piece is a tribute to physical labour with two figures hauling an ox carcass, a subject fitting to the busy market square and a form that brings dynamism to the otherwise rigid architecture. The concrete version of the piece won second prize for sculpture at the John Moore's Exhibition, Liverpool in 1959.

Recognition 
During the 1950s Brown's work attracted much critical acclaim and was shown alongside his contemporaries Kenneth Armitage, William Turnbull and Eduardo Paolozzi. Brown was elected a Royal Academician in 1972 and his work can be found in many prestigious public collections including the Tate Collection, Arts Council of Great Britain, Leeds City Art Gallery and many other public collections in Britain and overseas. Brown had a major retrospective at Leeds City Art Gallery in 1988. Ralph Brown is represented by Pangolin London.

Public collections 
Aberdeen Art Gallery, Scotland
Albright-Knox Collection, Buffalo, USA
Arts Council of Great Britain
Cass Foundation, Sculpture at Goodwood, UK
Chantrey Bequest Collection, UK
City of Bristol Museum and Art Gallery, UK
Contemporary Art Society, London
Doncaster Museum and Art Gallery UK
Halifax Art Gallery, UK
Hepworth Wakefield Gallery, UK
Huddersfield Art Gallery, UK
The Ingram Collection UK
Leeds City Galleries, UK
National Museum of Wales, Cardiff
Norfolk Contemporary Art Society, UK
Rijksmuseum Kroller-Muller, Netherlands
Royal Academy of Arts, London
Royal College of Art, London
Royal West of England Academy, Bristol UK
Salzburg State Museum, Austria
Southport Art Gallery, UK
Stuyvesant Foundation, RSA
Tate Britain.
University of Liverpool, UK
West Riding Education Committee UK

Public sculpture 
Meat Porters (1959–60). Sited in the Market Square at Harlow New Town, Essex in 1961
Market Place Fountain, Hatfield New Town, arranged through the Chairman of Digswell Arts Trust, now re-sited in front of the Sports Centre, 1962
Liverpool University, Engineering Block. Relief purchased by Eugene Rosenberg with FRS Yorke and CS Mardall, 1966
London, Manufacturers' Hanover Bank, David Ichbald, designer, commissioned bronze wave forms as large wall relief, 1970
The Patriarch, Jambo. Commissioned by Durrell Wildlife Conservation Trust for Jersey Zoo as a memorial to the famous gorilla, 1995
Meat Porters (1957–1960) exhibited at Sculpture at Goodwood, West Sussex, 2000–2008

Solo exhibitions 
2016, Ralph Brown & the Figure in the Fifties and Sixties.  Pangolin London
2015, Ralph Brown, Nine Sculptures.  108 Fine Art, Harrogate, Yorkshire
2014, Ralph Brown RA: A Memorial Exhibition, Pangolin London
2009, Ralph Brown at Eighty: The Early Decades Revisited, Pangolin London
2005, Number Nine Gallery, Birmingham
1999, Bruton Gallery, Leeds
1996, Alpha House Gallery, Sherborne, Dorset
1995, Napier Gallery, St Helier, Jersey
1988, Leeds City Art Gallery/Henry Moore Institute
1988, Mead Gallery, University of Warwick Arts Centre
1987, Eton Art Gallery, Windsor
1987, Beaux Arts Bath
1986, Solomon Gallery, London
1985, Long Island Gallery, New York
1984, Charles Foley Gallery, Columbus, Ohio
1983, Beaux Arts, Bath
1983, Puck Building, New York
1979, Browse and Darby, London
1976, Robert Welch Gallery, Chipping Campden
1976, Taranman Gallery, London
1975, Galerie H, Marseille
1974, Galerie Dortindeguey, Montpellier
1973, Gunther Franke, Munich drawings
1972, Archer Gallery, London
1972, Traklhaus Galerie, Salzburg Festival
1971, Form International, London
1964, Bangor University, Wales
1964, Forum Gallery, Bristol
1963, Leicester Galleries, London
1961, Leicester Galleries, London

Publications
'
'

'

References

External links

 
 Ralph Brown at Pangolin London
 Obituary: The Independent, 30 April 2013
 Obituary: The Guardian 9 May 2013
 Obituary: The Times June 8 2013
 Obituary: The Yorkshire Post 20 April 2013
 Tangent Films: Ralph Brown
 Profile on Royal Academy of Arts Collections

1928 births
2013 deaths
Alumni of Leeds Arts University
Alumni of the Royal College of Art
Artists from Leeds
British sculptors
British male sculptors
Geometry of Fear
Modern sculptors
Royal Academicians